Jovanni Yazhin Hurtado Meza (born December 14, 1991, in Guadalajara, Jalisco) is a Mexican professional footballer who plays for U. de G. He plays striker and has played for U. de G. since 2012.

References

External links
 

Living people
1991 births
Mexican footballers
Leones Negros UdeG footballers
Tampico Madero F.C. footballers
Ascenso MX players
Liga Premier de México players
Tercera División de México players
Footballers from Guadalajara, Jalisco
Association footballers not categorized by position